Pollapragada Janardhana Rao, popularly known as Jenny, is an Indian comedian and artist, who appears in Telugu films and Telugu television. Jenny is from a Telugu Brahmin family from Godavari District, Andhra Pradesh. He is a mime artist. He has performed at over 1,000 shows in India as well as abroad. He acted in comic roles in more than 400 films and on television. He also did mime in many government funded TV ads.

Partial filmography

Dabbu Bhale JabbuAnandam (2001)Pandurangadu (2008)Preminchukunnam Pelliki RandiParama Veera Chakra (2011)Shubhapradam (2010)Hello Brother (1994)Aha Naa Pellanta (1987)Ready (2008)Namo Venkatesa (2010)Anaganaga Oka Roju (1997)Annamayya (1997)GunshotShirdi Sai (2012)Aagadu (2014)Ayyare (2012)Sevakudu (2013)Naayak (2013)CashInspectorInspector AshwiniMaster (1997)Nenu (2004)Pedababu (2004)Nenunnanu (2004)
 Villain (2003)PellivaramandiSamanyudu (2006)Satyam (2003)Pelli Sandadi (1996)Slokam (2005)Yamaleela (1994)Victory (2008)Chupulu Kalasina ShubhavelaPadamati Sandhya Ragam (1987)Jayam (2002)Tagore (2003)Samanthakamani (2017)Play Back (2021)Amrutham'' as Various Characters (2001 - 2007)

References

External links

Indian male comedians
Telugu male actors
Telugu comedians
Living people
Year of birth missing (living people)
21st-century Indian actors
Indian mimes
Male actors from Andhra Pradesh
Indian male film actors